Dayen (also Romanized as Dāyen) is a village in Amiriyeh Rural District, in the Central District of Arak County, Markazi Province, Iran. At the 2006 census, its population was 447, in 110 families.

References 

Populated places in Arak County